The 2021 Northern State Wolves football team represented Northern State University as a member North Division of the Northern Sun Intercollegiate Conference (NSIC) during the 2021 NCAA Division II football season. Led by first-year head coach Mike Schmidt, the Wolves compiled an overall record of 7–4 with an identical mark in conference played, placing third in the NCIS North Division. The 2021 season marked the opening of Dacotah Bank Stadium in Aberdeen, South Dakota, where Northern State played home games.

Previous season
Due to the COVID-19 pandemic, the Northern Sun Intercollegiate Conference's 2020 season was cancelled. The 2020 season would have marked the first season for head coach Mike Schmidt who was hired in December 2019.

Schedule

References

Northern State
Northern State Wolves football seasons
Northern State Wolves football